Church unity may refer to:

The unity of the church, one of the Four Marks of the Church
The unity of the church expressed in Ecumenism
The goal of Church union

See also
Unity Church